Edgar Morgan may refer to:
Edgar Morgan (rugby union) (1882–1962), Welsh rugby union footballer of the 1900s and 1910s
Edgar Morgan (rugby) (1896–1983), Welsh rugby union and rugby league international of the 1920s